Christopher Page  (born 1952) is an English expert on medieval music, instruments and performance practice, together with the social and musical history of the guitar in England from the sixteenth century to the nineteenth. He has written numerous books regarding medieval music. He is currently a Fellow of Sidney Sussex College, Cambridge and Emeritus Professor of Medieval Music and Literature in the Faculty of English, University of Cambridge.

Life and career
Christopher Page, Fellow of the British Academy and Member of the Academia Europaea, was educated at Sir George Monoux Grammar School (founded 1527) in London and Balliol College, Oxford. He was formerly a junior research fellow at Jesus College, Oxford (1977–1980) and senior research fellow in music at Sidney Sussex.

He is the founder and director of Gothic Voices, an early music vocal ensemble, which has recorded 25 discs for Hyperion Records, many winning awards. The ensemble has performed in many countries, including, France, Germany, Portugal and Finland. London dates included twice-yearly sell-out concerts at London's Wigmore Hall. The ensemble gave its first Promenade Concert in 1989. The group's work has been chronicled most recently in Daniel Leech-Wilkinson, The Modern Invention of Medieval Music (CUP, 2007) and Richard Taruskin, Text and Act (OUP, 2006). His work has consistently been praised for its elegant and approachable prose.

Between 1989 and 1997, he was presenter of BBC Radio 3's Early Music programme, Spirit of the Age, and a presenter of the Radio 4 arts magazine Kaleidoscope. He has been chairman of the National Early Music Association and of the Plainsong and Medieval Music Society (founded 1889). He serves on the editorial boards of the journals Early Music (OUP) and Plainsong and Medieval Music (CUP).

Page was elected a Fellow of the Society of Antiquaries in 2008. He is a founder member of the Cambridge Consortium for Guitar Research, located at Sidney Sussex College.

In 2014, he was appointed Professor of Music at Gresham College. In this role he delivered four series of free public lectures within London.

He plays historical guitars, principally the four-course renaissance guitar and the early Romantic guitar.

In 2020, a festschrift in his honour appeared, Music and Instruments of the Middle Ages. Essays in Honour of Christopher Page, edited by Tess Knighton and David Skinner (Woodbridge: The Boydell Press).

Works
 Voices and Instruments of the Middle Ages. Instrumental Practice and Songs in France, 1100–1300 (London: Dent, 1987)
 The Owl and the Nightingale: Musical Life and Ideas in France 1100-1300 (London: Dent, 1989)
 The Summa Musice: A Thirteenth-Century Manual for Singers (1991)
 Discarding Images. Reflections on Music and Culture in Medieval France (Oxford: Clarendon Press & New York: Oxford University Press, 1993)
 Latin Poetry and Conductus Rhythm in Medieval France (London: Royal Musical Association, 1996)
 Music and Instruments of the Middle Ages. Studies on Texts and Performance (Aldershot: Variorum, 1997)
 The Christian West and Its Singers: The First Thousand Years (New Haven, CT: Yale University Press, 2010)
 The Guitar in Tudor England. A Social and Musical History (Cambridge: Cambridge University Press, 2015)
 The Guitar in Stuart England. A Social and Musical History (Cambridge: Cambridge University Press, 2017)
 The Guitar in Georgian England. A Social and Musical History (New Haven, CT: Yale University Press, 2020)
 ed., with Michael Fleming: Music and Instruments of the Elizabethan Age. The Eglantine Table (Woodbridge: The Boydell Press, 2021)
 ed., with Paul Sparks and James Westbrook: The Great Vogue for the Guitar in Western Europe, 1800–1840 (Woodbridge: The Boydell Press, 2023)

Of Page's study, The Christian West and Its Singers: The First Thousand Years (2010) Eamon Duffy wrote: "But once or twice in a generation a book comes along which crosses disciplinary boundaries to make unexpected connections, open up new imaginative vistas, and refocus what had seemed familiar historical landscapes. Page’s musician’s-eye view of the evolution of western Christendom is one of those books".

In 2017, The Guitar in Tudor England won the Nicholas Bessaraboff prize, awarded by the American Musical Instrument Society.

References

External links
Official homepage of Christopher Page at Sidney Sussex  retrieved 28th Dec 2010
http://www.hyperion-records.co.uk/artist_page.asp?name=page

Professors of Gresham College
Fellows of Jesus College, Oxford
Fellows of Sidney Sussex College, Cambridge
1952 births
Living people
British non-fiction writers
British writers about music
British performers of early music
BBC Radio 3 presenters
British male writers
Fellows of the British Academy
Male non-fiction writers